The Car's the Star is a British classic car television series hosted by Quentin Willson. In each episode, a biography of the car described by Willson was interspersed by interviews with the cars' owners. The show would sometimes show footage of owners club events and race days.

List of episodes and cars featured
S01E01 – Ford Zephyr/Zodiac (25 September 1994)
S01E02 – Jensen Interceptor (2 October 1994)
S01E03 – Austin Allegro (9 October 1994)
S01E04 – 1959 Cadillac Series 62 (16 October 1994)
S01E05 – Citroën DS (23 October 1994)
S01E06 – Ford Mustang (30 October 1994)

S02E01 – Land Rover (17 February 1995)
S02E02 – Triumph Herald (24 February 1995)
S02E03 – Austin-Healey (3 March 1995)
S02E04 – Volkswagen Golf GTI (9 May 1995)
S02E05 – Fiat 500 (16 May 1995)
S02E06 – Rolls-Royce Silver Cloud (23 May 1995)

S03E01 – Reliant Robin (14 September 1996)
S03E02 – Jaguar Mark 2 (9 November 1996)
S03E03 – Citroën 2CV (16 November 1996)

S04E01 – Jaguar E-Type (13 October 1997)
S04E02 – Austin Mini (20 October 1997)
S04E03 – Ford Capri (27 October 1997)
S04E04 – VW Camper Van (3 November 1997)
S04E05 – MGB (10 November 1997)
S04E06 – Chevrolet Corvette (17 November 1997)

S05E01 – AC Cobra (8 November 1998)
S05E02 – Hillman Imp (22 November 1998)
S05E03 – Ford Edsel (6 December 1998)
S05E04 – Porsche 911 (13 December 1998)
S05E05 – Lotus Seven (20 December 1998)
S05E06 – Lada (27 December 1998)

S06E01 – Rolls-Royce Silver Shadow (6 September 1999)
S06E02 – VW Beetle (13 September 1999)
S06E03 – McLaren F1 (20 September 1999)
S06E04 – Volvo Estate (27 September 1999)
S06E05 – Jeep (4 October 1999)
S06E06 – DeLorean (11 October 1999)

External links

References

BBC television documentaries
Automotive television series
1990s British documentary television series
1994 British television series debuts
1999 British television series endings
English-language television shows